Roberto Fernando Frojuello (8 November 1937 – 29 January 2021), known as Roberto Frojuello, was a Brazilian footballer who played as a forward for clubs in Brazil, Argentina and Chile. He made two appearances for the Brazil national team.

References

External links
 
 Roberto Fernando Frojuello at Mamvs.Narod

1937 births
2021 deaths
Brazilian footballers
Association football forwards
Brazil international footballers
São Paulo FC players
Club Atlético River Plate footballers
Colo-Colo footballers
Sociedade Esportiva Palmeiras players
Brazilian expatriate footballers
Brazilian expatriate sportspeople in Chile
Expatriate footballers in Chile
Brazilian expatriate sportspeople in Argentina
Expatriate footballers in Argentina
Footballers from São Paulo